Jason Pridmore (born October 4, 1969 in Goleta, California) is a retired American professional motorcycle racer who turned professional in 1990. He last raced professionally in the 2014 FIM World Endurance Championship on a BMW S1000RR for Team Penz 13. His professional career spanned 22 years, during which he won 21 American Motorcyclist Association (AMA) national races 17 of which are Superstock class wins (Formerly Supersport) which is second to Scott Russell. Pridmore was the AMA Formula Extreme Championship in 2002, the AMA 750 Supersport Championship in 1997 as well as the FIM Endurance World Championship title in 2003 & 2012 respectively. In addition to his professional racing career Pridmore instructs motorcyclists through his STAR Motorcycle school and JP43 Training programs. Pridmore also spends time as an expert analyst for Bein Sports coverage of the Moto America championships.

Coaching career 
Pridmore began coaching riders at his father's CLASS Motorcycle Schools when he was 16 years old. While racing professionally Pridmore mentored some of his younger teammates including Ben Spies, Nicky Hayden and Danny Eslick. His passion for sharing his knowledge led Pridmore to found STAR Motorcycle School in 1999 which he continues to run today.

STAR Motorcycle School 

Through STAR (Skills and Tactics for Advanced Riding) Pridmore has coached thousands of riders of varying levels ranging from beginners, trackday enthusiasts, amateur club racers as well as aspiring professionals. The school has travelled extensively across the country to some of the nations finest race tracks. Currently STAR School operates out of Chuckwalla Valley Raceway in Desert Center, CA.

JP43 Training 

Post retirement Pridmore began working extensively with both professional and club level riders in a 1-on-1 setting which has led to several noteworthy accomplishments. James Rispoli who came to road racing at a later age than most professionals won the AMA Supersport championship in 2011 and 2012 under Pridmore's tutelage. He continued onto international competition first by being offered a wildcard into the Moto 2 World Championship in 2013 and currently races in the British Superbike Championship. Corey Alexander won the 2013 AMA Supersport Championship and went on to race in the FIM World Supersport Championship in 2013. Other successful professional riders that Pridmore has worked with on a 1-on-1 basis include Benny Solis, Michael Gilbert, Elena Meyers, Caroline Olsen, Andrew Lee, Wyatt Farris, Conner Blevins and Patricia Fernandez. His 1-on-1 training sessions are not limited to professional riders, Pridmore trains trackday enthusiasts as well as competitive club racers out of Chuckwalla Valley Raceway and also travels to racetracks nationally and internationally to work with riders.

Military Coaching 

Through STAR Motorcycle as well as his individual programs Pridmore has trained thousands of US Military servicemen and servicewomen to be safer on their motorcycles. He conducts training both on military bases as well as on race tracks for the Marines and National Guard. Pridmore is an official instructor for the United States Marines Semper Ride program which has helped reduce US Marine incidents on motorcycles by over 46%.

Racing career 
Pridmore first raced professionally in 1990 in the AMA 750 Superstock Championship. He continued racing in various AMA championships including AMA 600 Supersport, AMA Formula Xtreme and AMA Superbike. Pridmore competed at the international level in the World Superbike Championship in 2008, the FIM World Supersport Championship in 2003 and most extensively in the FIM World Endurance Championship on and off between 1997 & 2014.

Career Highlights 

 2012 - Co-rode for the FIM Endurance World Championship winning team.
 2008 - Competed in five rounds of the 2008 Superbike World Championship on a Honda 1000cc machine for the Alto Evolution team.
 2003 - Became the first American make it to the podium of a World Supersport Race. Won the FIM Endurance World Championship with Phase One Endurance team partnered with James Ellison as his teammate.
 2002 - Won the AMA Formula Xtreme Championship for Attack Suzuki.
 1997 - Won the 750 Supersport class championship riding for Hypercycle Suzuki.
 1996 - Six top-five finishes in 600 SuperSport, Five top-10 750cc SuperSport finishes
 1992 - Won his first race as a professional At Brainerd, Minn., while handing Scott Russell his first defeat in three years. He again upset Russell with a come-from-behind victory at Road Atlanta two weeks later.

AMA Career by Year

AMA Career Race Wins

FIM Endurance World Championship

Personal life 
Pridmore is the son of three time AMA Superbike champion Reg Pridmore. He was raised and currently resides in Ventura, California. He is an avid Golfer and has competed in the US National Amateur Championship as well as the qualifying rounds for the US Open.

References

External links
JP43 Training
Moto America

American motorcycle racers
Living people
1969 births